Ryan A. Bizzarro (born ) is an American politician and member of the Pennsylvania House of Representatives and has represented the 3rd district since 2013. His district is located in Erie County and includes the townships of Millcreek and Fairview.

Bizzarro is a member of the Democratic Party and currently serves in House Democratic Leadership as the House Democratic Policy Chairman.

Early life and background 
Bizzarro is a lifelong resident of Erie, Pennsylvania. A survivor of childhood leukemia, he attended McDowell High School, in Erie, graduating in 2004.

In 2008, he graduated from Edinboro University with degrees in political science and criminal justice. He also received a master's degree from Gannon University in public administration. 

After receiving his master's degree, Bizzarro worked for the county as a victim/witness coordinator and as an advocate for the Office of the Erie County District Attorney and the Crime Victim Center. He also worked as a behavioral health specialist at McKinley Elementary School and in business development for the Erie County Convention Center Authority.

State representative 
Bizzarro was elected to the Pennsylvania House of Representatives in 2012, defeating Republican attorney Jason Owen, and was sworn in on January 1, 2013.

Bizzarro was elected to serve in House Democratic Leadership as the House Democratic Policy Committee Chairman for the 2021-22 Legislative Session. The Policy Committee traveled the state to host hearings and organize roundtable discussions and tours. The committee's work included explaining how federal dollars could be used to invest in PA's future through the PA Rescue Plan. Bizzarro was elected to chair the House Policy Committee in 2023-24. 

Under his leadership, Bizzarro oversaw the creation of the Subcommittee on Progressive Policies for Working People, which is chaired by Rep. Danilo Burgos. He also oversaw the creation of the Subcommittee on Labor, Energy, and Development, which is chaired by Rep. Nick Pisciottano. Rep. Mary Isaacson serves as the committee vice chair, and Rep. Melissa Shusterman serves as the committee deputy vice chair.

He also serves on the House Rules Committee. He previously served as chief deputy House whip, and vice chairman of the Northwest Delegation. Additional positions previously held include vice chairman of the House Democratic Policy Committee; Democratic secretary of the House Veterans Affairs & Emergency Preparedness Committee; and as a member of the House Consumer Affairs, Insurance and Judiciary committees as well as the Judiciary Subcommittee on Courts.

Bizzarro is on the Climate Change Advisory Committee, which is tasked to establish and review Pennsylvania's official action plan to combat climate change.  He also sits on the Pennsylvania Grade Crude Development Advisory Council, examining existing technical regulations and policies for the oil and gas industry.

Committee assignments 

 Policy Committee, chair
 Rules

Legislation 
Bizzarro authored Libre's Law, state law addressing punishment for animal abuse. In 2017 – the year Libre's Law was signed into effect – Bizzarro was named National Legislator of the Year by the Humane Society of the United States (2016).

Awards 
Bizzarro has been recognized for his service by several groups and organizations locally and nationally. In 2022, City & State featured him in PA's PowerList as one of Pennsylvania's most influential Forty Under 40. In 2020, the American Society of Clinical Oncology & Pennsylvania Society of Oncology and Hematology named him the Legislator of the Year. Other awards include the Erie Reader "40 Under 40" (2013), Edinboro University's Honored Alumnus of the Year (2014), Humane Society Legislator of the Year (2016), Pennsylvania Snowmobile Association Legislator of the Year (2018), and Best of Erie's "Best Politician" in the years 2015, 2016 and 2017 (the category was removed in 2018).

Personal life 
Bizzarro's family is prominent in the boxing world. He lives in Millcreek Township with his rescue dog, Boss.  

On October 15, 2014, Bizzarro and Representative Marty Flynn were near the Pennsylvania State Capitol after having a late dinner when someone approached and demanded their wallets at gunpoint. Flynn reached for his concealed pistol and a spotter warned the assailant, leading to a shootout. Nobody was injured. Four teenagers were arrested.

References

External links
Pennsylvania House of Representatives – Rep. Ryan Bizzarro official PA House website
Pennsylvania House Democratic Caucus - Rep. Ryan Bizzarro official party website

Living people
Politicians from Erie, Pennsylvania
Edinboro University of Pennsylvania alumni
Gannon University alumni
Democratic Party members of the Pennsylvania House of Representatives
1985 births
21st-century American politicians